Abednego Matilu (born 21 November 1968) is a retired Kenyan sprinter who specialised in the 400 metres. He represented his country at the 1992 Summer Olympics, as well as three World Championships. He was part of the 4 × 400 metres relay team that won the silver at the 1993 World Championships in Stuttgart.

His personal best in the event is 44.97 seconds set at the 1995 World Championships in Gothenburg.

Competition record

References

External links 
 
 

1968 births
Living people
Kenyan male sprinters
Athletes (track and field) at the 1992 Summer Olympics
Olympic athletes of Kenya
Athletes (track and field) at the 1994 Commonwealth Games
Athletes (track and field) at the 1998 Commonwealth Games
World Athletics Championships medalists
Commonwealth Games competitors for Kenya
African Games bronze medalists for Kenya
African Games medalists in athletics (track and field)
Athletes (track and field) at the 1999 All-Africa Games
20th-century Kenyan people